Poia is a village in West Champaran district in the Indian state of Bihar.

Demographics
As of 2011 India census, Poia had a population of 438 in 70 households. Males constitute 50.9% of the population and females 49%. Poia has an average literacy rate of 29.2%, lower than the national average of 74%: male literacy is 65.6%, and female literacy is 34.3%. In Poia, 16.891% of the population is under 6 years of age.

References

Villages in West Champaran district